Jovan Ovčarević (1557) was a Habsburg Serb nobleman. He was a member of the Ovčarević family, a notable Serb family in Habsburg service in the 16th century, and was a kinsman or descendant of the earlier Petar Ovčarević (fl. 1521–41), a Šajkaši commander and spy, and relative of contemporaries Mihailo Ovčarević (fl. 1550–79), a Šajkaši commander, and Dimitrije Ovčarević (fl. 1552–66), the captain of Gyula. Jovan Ovčarević was mentioned as accompanying a mission to the sultan in 1557, being in the entourage of Vrančić and Franja Zaj while they were legates in Constantinople. Nothing more is known of him.

References

Sources
 
 
 
 

16th-century Serbian people
Habsburg Serbs
Serbs of Vojvodina